Tetracanthagyna is a genus of dragonflies in the family Aeshnidae.

T. plagiata is the world's largest dragonfly by wingspan and the female T. plagiata is probably the heaviest living odonate.

The genus contains the following species:
Tetracanthagyna bakeri 
Tetracanthagyna brunnea 
Tetracanthagyna degorsi 
Tetracanthagyna plagiata  – giant hawker
Tetracanthagyna waterhousei  – giant river hawker

References

Aeshnidae
Anisoptera genera
Taxa named by Edmond de Sélys Longchamps